Ministry of Agriculture, Livestock and Irrigation (abbreviated MOALI) is the ministry which was composed with three former ministries, Ministry of Livestock, Fisheries and Rural Development, Ministry of Agriculture and Irrigation and Ministry of Cooperatives.

Departments

Union Minister Office 
Department of Agriculture (DOA)
Department of Planning 
Department of Agriculture Land Management and Statistics
Irrigation and Water Utilization Management Department 
Agricultural Mechanization Department 
Department of Agricultural Research  
Small-scale Industries Department 
Livestock Breeding and Veterinary Department 
Department of Fisheries
Yezin Agricultural University
University of Veterinary Science

Department of Rural Development and Department of Cooperatives were formed as Ministry of Cooperatives and Rural Development in June 2021.

References

External links

AgricultureLivestockandIrrigation
Myanmar
Myanmar
Myanmar
Agricultural organisations based in Myanmar
Ministries established in 2016
2016 establishments in Myanmar